Harutaeographa is a moth genus in the family Noctuidae.

Species
 Harutaeographa adusta Hreblay & Ronkay, 1999
 Harutaeographa akos (Hreblay, 1996)
 Harutaeographa babai (Sugi & Sakurai, 1994)
 Harutaeographa bicolorata Hreblay & Ronkay, 1998
 Harutaeographa bidui (Hreblay & Plante, 1996)
 Harutaeographa brahma Hreblay & Ronkay, 1998
 Harutaeographa brumosa Yoshimoto, 1994
 Harutaeographa caerulea Yoshimoto, 1993
 Harutaeographa castanea Yoshimoto, 1993
 Harutaeographa castaneipennis (Hampson, 1894)
 Harutaeographa cinerea Hreblay & Ronkay, 1998
 Harutaeographa craspedophora (Boursin, 1969)
 Harutaeographa diffusa Yoshimoto, 1994
 Harutaeographa elphinia Hreblay & Ronkay, 1999
 Harutaeographa eriza (Swinhoe, 1901)
 Harutaeographa fasciculata (Hampson, 1894)
 Harutaeographa ferrosticta (Hampson, 1894)
 Harutaeographa ganeshi Hreblay & Ronkay, 1998
 Harutaeographa izabella Hreblay & Ronkay, 1998
 Harutaeographa kofka Hreblay, 1996
 Harutaeographa loeffleri Ronkay, Ronkay, Gyulai & Hacker, 2010
 Harutaeographa maria Hreblay & Ronkay, 1999
 Harutaeographa marpha Hreblay & Ronkay, 1999
 Harutaeographa monimalis (Draudt, 1950)
 Harutaeographa odavissa Ronkay, Ronkay, Gyulai & Hacker, 2010
 Harutaeographa orias Hreblay, 1996
 Harutaeographa pallida Yoshimoto, 1993
 Harutaeographa pinkisherpani Hreblay & Ronkay, 1998
 Harutaeographa rama Hreblay & Plante, 1996
 Harutaeographa rubida (Hampson, 1894)
 Harutaeographa saba Hreblay & Plante, 1996
 Harutaeographa seibaldi Ronkay, Ronkay, Gyulai & Hacker, 2010
 Harutaeographa shui Benedek & Saldaitis, 2012
 Harutaeographa siva Hreblay, 1996
 Harutaeographa stangelmaieri Ronkay, Ronkay, Gyulai & Hacker, 2010
 Harutaeographa stenoptera (Staudinger, 1892)
 Harutaeographa yangzisherpani Hreblay & Ronkay, 1999

References
 Harutaeographa at funet.fi
 Natural History Museum Lepidoptera genus database

Orthosiini